Erik Rauch (May 15, 1974 – July 13, 2005) was an American biophysicist and  theoretical ecologist who worked at NECSI, MIT, Santa Fe Institute, Yale University, Princeton University, and other institutions.
Rauch's most notable paper was published in Nature and concerned the mathematical modeling of the conservation of biodiversity.

Biography
He received a B.S. in Computer Science and Mathematics from Yale University in May 1996, where he was the technician for campus humor magazine The Yale Record. His undergraduate thesis was "The Geometry of Critical Ising Clusters", under the direction of Benoit Mandelbrot, the inventor of fractal geometry. He then worked at the IBM Watson Research Center in the theoretical physics department, and began graduate study at Stanford University in 1996.

He received his PhD from Massachusetts Institute of Technology in 2004 under the direction of Gerald Sussman: his thesis topic was " Diversity of Evolving Systems: Scaling and Dynamics of Genealogical Trees "

He then joined the Department of Ecology and Evolutionary Biology at Princeton University as a postdoctoral fellow in the group of Simon A. Levin, the Moffett professor of biology in 2005, and was in that position at his early death.

His hobby of collecting place names led Rauch to found MetaCarta with John Frank and Doug Brenhouse.  Using MetaCarta's software, Rauch developed maps like the four below for fun.  Rauch was an inventor of spatial information processing systems.

He founded several organizations, including
 ALife
 TerraShare
 MetaCarta

He proposed an approach for car-free neighbourhoods to the zoning board of Cambridge, Massachusetts.

He died in a hiking accident in California's Sequoia National Park at age 31.

Published works related to biological diversity

References

Diversity is unevenly distributed within species an informal presentation of the results in the above paper (Nature 431, 449–452)
Erik Rauch—Mathematics Genealogy Project.

Gallery

External links
 Erich Rauch's CV at Stanford
 www.erikrauch.org A snapshot of the web surrounding Rauch's original webpage.  , many of the papers could be read from their original servers linked from Erik's primary home page at MIT.
 no violence period Rauch's compilation of "Unconventional Pro-Life Perspectives on Abortion and the Right to Life"
 Available through AIP:  Long-range interactions and evolutionary stability in a predator-prey system
 MetaCarta

1974 births
2005 deaths
Accidental deaths in California
Mathematical ecologists
Santa Fe Institute people